Dr. Iqbal Singh (born 4 June 1945) was the lieutenant governor of Puducherry, India. He took charge in July 2009.

Politics
Singh has the distinction of holding several significant positions in the Indian National Congress, including Secretary, All India Congress Committee for 12 continuous years and was an invitee to Congress Working Committee.  He was Member of Parliament of Rajya Sabha from 1992–98.

Honours
In recognition of his contributions, Andhra University had conferred upon him the Honorary Degree of Doctor of Letters (D.Litt.) on 5 December 2009.

References

External links
 Lieutenant Governor of Puducherry
    Asia Tribune
    The Hindu: Doctorate conferred on Iqbal Singh
    Government Of India Official Website

1945 births
Living people
Indian Sikhs
People from Lahore
Lieutenant Governors of Puducherry
Rajya Sabha members from Punjab, India
Indian National Congress politicians